Mauricio Islas (born Juan Mauricio Islas Ilescas, August 16, 1973) is a Mexican actor. He is best known for his work in telenovelas produced by Televisa, TV Azteca, Telemundo, and Venevision.

Early life
Born in Mexico City, Mexico, Islas is the son of businessman, Juan Islas, and Rosalinda Ilescas, and the youngest of two brothers.

Career
After working in various telenovelas, Islas had his first starring role with Preciosa, alongside Irán Castillo in 1998.

From then on he continued working mainly as a leading actor, but occasionally playing antagonic roles, as in his 2000 participation in Primer amor... a mil por hora where he interpreted the malicious Demián and in 2006 Amores de Mercado, starring as Fernando Leyra.

In 2001, he starred in El manantial, alongside Adela Noriega. He won a TVyNovelas Award for his performance. In 2003, he starred in the acclaimed historical telenovela, Amor real, interpreting the army soldier Adolfo Solis.

In 2004, he signed a contract with Telemundo and starred in Prisionera, Amores de Mercado, Pecados Ajenos and other successful productions from the network.

He returned to Mexico in 2010 and starred in the TV Azteca telenovelas, La Loba and Cielo Rojo.

Personal life
On November 29, 2001, he married Venezuelan singer, Patricia Villasaña. They had a daughter, Camila, born on May 3, 2002. They divorced in 2006. 

He later had a son, Emiliano, with his current partner Paloma Quezada. The baby was born on February 24, 2011, in El Paso, Texas.

Filmography

Film

Television

References

External links
Official website

Mexican male telenovela actors
1973 births
Mexican male film actors
Male actors from Mexico City
Living people